Karakapı, possibly known in antiquity as Mysthia or Mysty,  is a town  in Altunhisar district of Niğde Province, Turkey. The town is situated in the Central Anatolian plains to the south of Hasandağı volcano. The population of Karakapı is 3162 as of 2011. The town was captured by Seljuk Turks during the reign of Suleyman I of Rum in the second half of the 11th century. After the rule of Karamanids, it was captured by the Ottomans in the 15th century during the reign of Mehmet II. In 1999 the settlement was declared a seat of township. The town economy depends on dry agriculture. Some Karakapı citizens work in services in the cities.

References

Populated places in Niğde Province
Towns in Turkey
Altunhisar District